Nikolay Nikolayevich Bogolyubov (21 August 1909 – 13 February 1992), also transliterated as Bogoliubov and Bogolubov, was a Soviet, Ukraininan and Russian mathematician and theoretical physicist known for a significant contribution to quantum field theory, classical and quantum statistical mechanics, and the theory of dynamical systems; he was the recipient of the 1992 Dirac Medal.

Biography

Early life (1909–1921)
Nikolay Bogolyubov was born on 21 August 1909 in Nizhny Novgorod, Russian Empire to Russian Orthodox Church priest and seminary teacher of theology, psychology and philosophy Nikolay Mikhaylovich Bogolyubov, and Olga Nikolayevna Bogolyubova, a teacher of music. The Bogolyubovs relocated to the village of Velikaya Krucha in the Poltava Governorate (now in Poltava Oblast, Ukraine) in 1919, where the young Nikolay Bogolyubov began to study physics and mathematics. The family soon moved to Kiev in 1921, where they continued to live in poverty as the elder Nikolay Bogolyubov only found a position as a priest in 1923.

He attended research seminars in Kyiv University and soon started to work under the supervision of the well-known contemporary mathematician Nikolay Krylov. In 1924, at the age of 15, Nikolay Bogolyubov wrote his first published scientific paper On the behavior of solutions of linear differential equations at infinity. In 1925 he entered Ph.D. program at the Academy of Sciences of the Ukrainian SSR and obtained the degree of Kandidat Nauk (Candidate of Sciences, equivalent to a Ph.D.) in 1928, at the age of 19, with the doctoral thesis titled On direct methods of variational calculus. In 1930, at the age of 21, he obtained the degree of Doktor nauk (Doctor of Sciences, equivalent to Habilitation), the highest degree in the Soviet Union, which requires the recipient to have made a significant independent contribution to his or her scientific field.

This early period of Bogolyubov's work in science was concerned with such mathematical problems as direct methods of the calculus of variations, the theory of almost periodic functions, methods of approximate solution of differential equations, and dynamical systems. This earlier research had already earned him recognition. One of his essays was awarded the Bologna Academy of Sciences Prize in 1930, and the author was awarded the erudite degree of doctor of mathematics. This was the period when the scientific career of the young Nikolay Bogolyubov began, later producing new scientific trends in modern mathematics, physics, and mechanics.

Since 1931, Krylov and Bogolyubov worked together on the problems of nonlinear mechanics and nonlinear oscillations. They were the key figures in the "Kiev school of nonlinear oscillation research", where their cooperation resulted in the paper "On the quasiperiodic solutions of the equations of nonlinear mechanics" (1934) and the book Introduction to Nonlinear Mechanics (1937; translated to English in 1947) leading to a creation of a large field of non-linear mechanics.

Distinctive features of the Kiev School approach included an emphasis on the computation of solutions (not just a proof of its existence), approximations of periodic solutions, use of the invariant manifolds in the phase space, and applications of a single unified approach to many different problems. From a control engineering point of view, the key achievement of the Kiev School was the development by Krylov and Bogolyubov of the describing function method for the analysis of nonlinear control problems.

In the period 1928–1973, Nikolay Bogolyubov worked in the Institute for Theoretical Physics of the Academy of Sciences of the Ukrainian SSR holding the position of the Director of the institute since 1965. He lectured at Kiev University in the period 1936–1959.

In evacuation (1941–1943)
After the German attack against the Soviet Union on 22 June 1941 (beginning of the Great Patriotic War), most institutes and universities from the western part of Russia were evacuated into the eastern regions, far from the battle lines. Nikolay Bogolyubov moved to Ufa, where he became Head of the Departments of Mathematical Analysis at Ufa State Aviation Technical University and at Ufa Pedagogical Institute, remaining on these positions during the period of July 1941 – August 1943.

Moscow (1943–?)
In autumn 1943, Bogolyubov came from evacuation to Moscow and on 1 November 1943 he accepted a position in the Department of Theoretical Physics at the Moscow State University (MSU). At that time the Head of the Department was Anatoly Vlasov (for a short period in 1944 the Head of the Department was Vladimir Fock). Theoretical physicists working in the department in that period included Dmitri Ivanenko, Arseny Sokolov, and other physicists.

In the period 1943–1946, Bogolyubov's research was essentially concerned with the theory of stochastic processes and asymptotic methods. In his work a simple example of an anharmonic oscillator driven by a superposition of incoherent sinusoidal oscillations with continuous spectrum was used to show that depending on a specific approximation time scale the evolution of the system can be either deterministic, or a stochastic process satisfying Fokker–Planck equation, or even a process which is neither deterministic nor stochastic. In other words, he showed that depending on the choice of the time scale for the corresponding approximations the same stochastic process can be regarded as both dynamical and Markovian, and in the general case as a non-Markov process. This work was the first to introduce the notion of time hierarchy in non-equilibrium statistical physics which then became the key concept in all further development of the statistical theory of irreversible processes.

In 1945, Bogolyubov proved a fundamental theorem on the existence and basic properties of a one-parameter integral manifold for a system of non-linear differential equations. He investigated periodic and quasi-periodic solutions lying on a one-dimensional manifold, thus forming the foundation for a new method of non-linear mechanics, the method of integral manifolds.

In 1946, he published in JETP two works on equilibrium and non-equilibrium statistical mechanics which became the essence of his fundamental monograph Problems of dynamical theory in statistical physics (Moscow, 1946).

On 26 January 1953, Nikolay Bogolyubov became the Head of the Department of Theoretical Physics at MSU, after Anatoly Vlasov decided to leave the position on January 2, 1953.

Steklov Institute (1947–?)

In 1947, Nikolay Bogolyubov organized and became the Head of the Department of Theoretical Physics at the Steklov Institute of Mathematics. In 1969, the Department of Theoretical Physics was separated into the Departments of Mathematical Physics (Head Vasily Vladimirov), of Statistical Mechanics, and of Quantum Field Theory (Head Mikhail Polivanov). While working in the Steklov Institute, Nikolay Bogolyubov and his school contributed to science with many important works including works on renormalization theory, renormalization group, axiomatic S-matrix theory, and works on the theory of dispersion relations.

In the late 1940s and 1950s, Bogolyubov worked on the theory of superfluidity and superconductivity, where he developed the method of BBGKY hierarchy for a derivation of kinetic equations, formulated microscopic theory of superfluidity, and made other essential contributions. Later he worked on quantum field theory, where introduced the Bogoliubov transformation, formulated and proved the Bogoliubov's edge-of-the-wedge theorem and Bogoliubov–Parasyuk theorem (with Ostap Parasyuk), and obtained other significant results. In the 1960s his attention turned to the quark model of hadrons; in 1965 he was among the first scientists to study the new quantum number color charge.

In 1946, Nikolay Bogolyubov was elected as a Corresponding Member of the Academy of Sciences of the Soviet Union. He was elected a full member (academician) of the Academy of Sciences of the Ukrainian SSR and in full member of the Academy of Sciences of the USSR in 1953.

Dubna (1956–1992)

Since 1956, he worked in the Joint Institute for Nuclear Research (JINR), Dubna, Russia, where he was a founder (together with Dmitry Blokhintsev) and the first director of the Laboratory of Theoretical Physics. This laboratory, where Nikolay Bogolyubov worked for a long time, has traditionally been the home of the prominent Russian schools in quantum field theory, theoretical nuclear physics, statistical physics, and nonlinear mechanics. Nikolay Bogolyubov was Director of the JINR in the period 1966–1988.

Family

He had two sons - Pavel and Nikolay (jr). Nikolay Boglyubov (jr) is a theoretical physicist working in the fields of mathematical physics and statistical mechanics.

Students
Nikolay Bogolyubov was a scientific supervisor of Yurii Mitropolskiy, Dmitry Shirkov, Selim Krein, Iosif Gihman, Tofik Mamedov, Kirill Gurov, Mikhail Polivanov, Naftul Polsky, Galina Biryuk, Sergei Tyablikov, Dmitry Zubarev, Vladimir Kadyshevsky, and many other students. His method of teaching, based on creation of a warm atmosphere, politeness and kindness, is famous in Russia and is known as the "Bogolyubov approach".

Awards
Nikolay Bogolyubov received various high USSR honors and international awards.

Soviet
 Two Stalin Prizes (1947, 1953)
 USSR State Prize (1984)
 Lenin Prize (1958)
 Hero of Socialist Labour, twice (1969, 1979)
 Six Orders of Lenin (1953, 1959, 1967, 1969, 1975, 1979)
 Order of the October Revolution (1984)
 Order of the Red Banner of Labour, twice (1948, 1954)
 Order of the Badge of Honour, twice (1944, 1944)

Foreign awards
 Order of Cyril and Methodius, 1st class (Bulgaria, 1969)
 Order "For merits", 2nd class (Poland, 1977) 

Academic awards
 Award of the Bologna Academy of Sciences (1930)
Heineman Prize for Mathematical Physics (American Physical Society, 1966)
 Gold Medal Helmholtz (Academy of Sciences of the German Democratic Republic, 1969)
Max Planck Medal (1973)
Franklin Medal (1974)
 Gold Medal "For service to science and humanity" (Slovak Academy of Sciences, 1975)
 Karpinski Prize (Germany, 1981)
 Gold Medal Lavrent'ev (1983) - for his work "On stochastic processes in dynamical systems"
Lomonosov Gold Medal (1985) - for outstanding achievement in mathematics and theoretical physics
 Gold Medal of Lyapunov (1989) - for his work on sustainability, critical phenomena and phase transitions in the theory of many interacting particles
Dirac Medal (1992, posthumously)

Academic recognition
 Foreign Honorary Member of the National Academy of Sciences (United States, 1959), American Academy of Arts and Sciences (1960), Bulgarian Academy of Sciences (1961); a foreign member of the Polish Academy of Sciences (1962), GDR Academy of Sciences (1966), Hungarian Academy of Sciences (1970), Academy of Sciences in Heidelberg (1968), Czechoslovak Academy of Sciences (1980), Indian Academy of Sciences (1983), Mongolian Academy of Sciences (1983)
 Honorary Doctor of the University of Allahabad, India (1958), Berlin (East Germany, 1960), Chicago (USA, 1967), Turin (Italy, 1969), Wroclaw (Poland, 1970), Bucharest (Romania, 1971), Helsinki (Finland, 1973), Ulan Bator (Mongolia, 1977), Warsaw (Poland, 1977)

Memory
Institutions, awards and locations have been named in Bogolyubov's memory:
 N.N. Bogolyubov Institute for Theoretical Problems of Microphysics (Moscow State University)
 Bogoliubov Institute of Theoretical Physics National Academy of Sciences of Ukraine (Kiev, Ukraine)
 Bogoliubov Laboratory of Theoretical Physics (Joint Institute for Nuclear Research, Dubna)
 Bogolyubov Prize (Joint Institute for Nuclear Research) for scientists with outstanding contribution to theoretical physics and applied mathematics
 Bogolyubov Prize for young scientists (Joint Institute for Nuclear Research)
 Bogolyubov Prize (National Academy of Sciences of Ukraine) for scientists with outstanding contribution to theoretical physics and applied mathematics
 Bogolyubov Gold Medal (Russian Academy of Sciences)
 Bust of Academician NN Bogolyubov (Nizhny Novgorod)
 Bust of Academician NN Bogolyubov (Dubna)
 Bogolyubov prospect (Dubna's central street)
 Commemorative plaque at the entrance of the Physics Department of Moscow State University

In 2009, the centenary of Nikolay Bogolyubov's birth was celebrated with two conferences in Russia and Ukraine:
International Bogolyubov Conference: Problems of Theoretical and Mathematical Physics 21–27 August, Moscow-Dubna, Russia.
Bogolyubov Kyiv Conference: Modern Problems of Theoretical and Mathematical Physics  15–18 September, Kiev, Ukraine.

Research
Fundamental works of Nikolay Bogolyubov were devoted to asymptotic methods of nonlinear mechanics, quantum field theory, statistical field theory, variational calculus, approximation methods in mathematical analysis, equations of mathematical physics, theory of stability, theory of dynamical systems, and to many other areas.

He built a new theory of scattering matrices, formulated the concept of microscopical causality, obtained important results in quantum electrodynamics, and investigated on the basis of the edge-of-the-wedge theorem the dispersion relations in elementary particle physics. He suggested a new synthesis of the Bohr theory of quasiperiodic functions and developed methods for asymptotic integration of nonlinear differential equations which describe oscillating processes.

Mathematics and non-linear mechanics
In 1932–1943, in the early stage of his career, he worked in collaboration with Nikolay Krylov on mathematical problems of nonlinear mechanics and developed mathematical methods for asymptotic integration of non-linear differential equations. He also applied these methods to problems of statistical mechanics.
In 1937, jointly with Nikolay Krylov he proved the Krylov–Bogolyubov theorems.
In 1956, at the International Conference on Theoretical Physics in Seattle, USA (September, 1956), he presented the formulation and the first proof of the edge-of-the-wedge theorem. This theorem in the theory of functions of several complex variables has important implications to the dispersion relations in elementary particle physics.

Statistical mechanics
1939 Jointly with Nikolay Krylov gave the first consistent microscopic derivation of the Fokker–Planck equation in the single scheme of classical and quantum mechanics.
1945 Suggested the idea of hierarchy of relaxation times, which is significant for statistical theory of irreversible processes.
1946 Developed a general method for a microscopic derivation of kinetic equations for classical systems. The method was based on the hierarchy of equations for multi-particle distribution functions known now as Bogoliubov–Born–Green–Kirkwood–Yvon hierarchy.
1947 Jointly with K. P. Gurov extended this method to the derivation of kinetic equations for quantum systems on the basis of the quantum BBGKY hierarchy.
1947—1948 Introduced kinetic equations in the theory of superfluidity, computed the excitation spectrum for a weakly imperfect Bose gas, showed that this spectrum has the same properties as spectrum of Helium II, and used this analogy for a theoretical description of superfluidity of Helium II.
1958 Formulated a microscopic theory of superconductivity and established an analogy between superconductivity and superfluidity phenomena; this contribution was discussed in details in the book A New Method in the Theory of Superconductivity (co-authors V. V. Tolmachev and D. V. Shirkov, Moscow, Academy of Sciences Press, 1958).

Quantum theory
1955 Developed an axiomatic theory for the scattering matrix (S-matrix) in quantum field theory and introduced the causality condition for S-matrix in terms of variational derivatives.
1955 Jointly with Dmitry Shirkov developed the renormalization group method.
1955 Jointly with Ostap Parasyuk proved the theorem on the finiteness and uniqueness (for renormalizable theories) of the scattering matrix in any order of perturbation theory (Bogoliubov-Parasyuk theorem) and developed a procedure (R-operation) for a practical subtraction of singularities in quantum field theory.
1965 Jointly with Boris Struminsky and Albert Tavkhelidze and independently of Moo-Young Han, Yoichiro Nambu and Oscar W. Greenberg suggested a triplet quark model and introduced a new quantum degree of freedom (later called as color charge) for quarks.
Suggested a first proof of dispersion relations in quantum field theory.

Publications

Books
Mathematics and Non-linear Mechanics:
N. M. Krylov and N. N. Bogoliubov (1934): On various formal expansions of non-linear mechanics. Kiev, Izdat. Zagal'noukr. Akad. Nauk. 
N. M. Krylov and N. N. Bogoliubov (1947): Introduction to Nonlinear Mechanics. Princeton, Princeton University Press.
N. N. Bogoliubov, Y. A. Mitropolsky (1961): Asymptotic Methods in the Theory of Non-Linear Oscillations. New York, Gordon and Breach.

Statistical Mechanics:
N. N. Bogoliubov (1945): On Some Statistical Methods in Mathematical Physics. Kyiv .
N. N. Bogoliubov, V. V. Tolmachev, D. V. Shirkov (1959): A New Method in the Theory of Superconductivity. New York, Consultants Bureau.
N. N. Bogoliubov (1960): Problems of Dynamic Theory in Statistical Physics. Oak Ridge, Tenn., Technical Information Service.
N. N. Bogoliubov (1967—1970): Lectures on Quantum Statistics. Problems of Statistical Mechanics of Quantum Systems. New York, Gordon and Breach.
N. N. Bogolubov and N. N. Bogolubov, Jnr. (1992): Introduction to Quantum Statistical Mechanics. Gordon and Breach. .

Quantum Field Theory:
N. N. Bogoliubov, B. V. Medvedev, M. K. Polivanov (1958): Problems in the Theory of Dispersion Relations. Institute for Advanced Study, Princeton.
N. N. Bogoliubov, D. V. Shirkov (1959): The Theory of Quantized Fields. New York, Interscience. The first text-book on the renormalization group theory.
N. N. Bogoliubov, A. A. Logunov and I. T. Todorov (1975): Introduction to Axiomatic Quantum Field Theory. Reading, Mass.: W. A. Benjamin, Advanced Book Program. . .
N. N. Bogoliubov, D. V. Shirkov (1980): Introduction to the Theory of Quantized Field. John Wiley & Sons Inc; 3rd edition. . .
N. N. Bogoliubov, D. V. Shirkov (1982): Quantum Fields. Benjamin-Cummings Pub. Co., .
N. N. Bogoliubov, A. A. Logunov, A. I. Oksak, I. T. Todorov (1990): General Principles of Quantum Field Theory. Dordrecht [Holland]; Boston, Kluwer Academic Publishers. . .

Selected works
N. N. Bogoliubov, Selected Works. Part I. Dynamical Theory. Gordon and Breach, New York, 1990. , .
N. N. Bogoliubov, Selected Works. Part II. Quantum and Classical Statistical Mechanics. Gordon and Breach, New York, 1991. .
N. N. Bogoliubov, Selected Works. Part III. Nonlinear Mechanics and Pure Mathematics. Gordon and Breach, Amsterdam, 1995. .
N. N. Bogoliubov, Selected Works. Part IV. Quantum Field Theory. Gordon and Breach, Amsterdam, 1995. , .

Selected papers

"On Question about Superfluidity Condition in the Nuclear Matter Theory" (in Russian), Doklady Akademii Nauk USSR, 119, 52, 1958.
 "On One Variational Principle in Many Body Problem" (in Russian), Doklady Akademii Nauk USSR, 119, N2, 244, 1959.
"On Compensation Principle in the Method of Selfconformed Field" (in Russian), Uspekhi Fizicheskhih Nauk, 67, N4, 549, 1959.
"The Quasi-averages in Problems of Statistical Mechanics" (in Russian), Preprint D-781, JINR, Dubna, 1961.
"On the Hydrodynamics of a Superfluiding" (in Russian), Preprint P-1395, JINR, Dubna, 1963.

See also
Bogoliubov approximation
Bogolyubov-Born-Green-Kirkwood-Yvon hierarchy
Bogoliubov causality condition
Bogolyubov's edge-of-the-wedge theorem
Bogolyubov inequality
Bogoliubov inner product
Bogolyubov's lemma
Bogoliubov-Parasyuk theorem
Bogoliubov quasiparticle
Bogoliubov transformation
Describing function method
Goldstone boson
Krylov-Bogoliubov averaging method
Krylov-Bogolyubov theorem
Landau pole
Peierls–Bogoliubov inequality
Quantum triviality

References

Further reading

External links
Bogolyubov Institute for Theoretical Physics of the National Academy of Sciences of Ukraine.
Bogolyubov Institute for Theoretical Problems of Microphysics at the Lomonosov Moscow State University, Russia.
Bogolyubov Laboratory of Theoretical Physics at the Joint Institute for Nuclear Research, Dubna, Russia.
Department of Theoretical Physics in the Steklov Mathematical Institute, Moscow, Russia (created by Nikolay Bogolyubov).
The role of Nikolay Bogoliubov in Dubna's Russian Orthodox Christian church (in Russian).

 Author profile in the database zbMATH

1909 births
1992 deaths
Fellows of the American Academy of Arts and Sciences
Foreign associates of the National Academy of Sciences
Foreign Fellows of the Indian National Science Academy
Foreign Members of the Bulgarian Academy of Sciences
Full Members of the Russian Academy of Sciences
Full Members of the USSR Academy of Sciences
Members of the German Academy of Sciences at Berlin
Members of the National Academy of Sciences of Ukraine
Academic staff of Moscow State University
Taras Shevchenko National University of Kyiv alumni
Academic staff of the Taras Shevchenko National University of Kyiv
Seventh convocation members of the Soviet of the Union
Eighth convocation members of the Soviet of the Union
Ninth convocation members of the Soviet of the Union
Tenth convocation members of the Soviet of the Union
Eleventh convocation members of the Soviet of the Union
Heroes of Socialist Labour
Stalin Prize winners
Lenin Prize winners
Recipients of the Lomonosov Gold Medal
Recipients of the Order of Lenin
Recipients of the Order of the Red Banner of Labour
Recipients of the USSR State Prize
Winners of the Max Planck Medal
Control theorists
Mathematical physicists
Quantum physicists
Soviet physicists
Soviet mathematicians
Soviet inventors
Theoretical physicists
Superfluidity
Burials at Novodevichy Cemetery